Pandanus tectorius is a species of Pandanus (screwpine) that is native to Malesia, Papuasia, eastern Australia, and the Pacific Islands. It grows in the coastal lowlands typically near the edge of the ocean. Common names in English include thatch screwpine, Tahitian screwpine, hala tree ( in Hawaiian) and pandanus. The edible fruit is sometimes known as hala fruit.

Description
P. tectorius is a small tree that grows upright to reach  in height. The single trunk is slender with brown ringed bark. It is supported by aerial roots (prop roots) that firmly anchors the tree to the ground. Roots sometimes grow along the branch, and they grow at wide angles in proportion to the trunk.

Flowers

Pandanus tectorius is dioecious, meaning male and female flowers are borne on separate trees, with very different male and female flowers. Male flowers, known as racemes, are small, fragrant, and short-lived, lasting only a single day. The flowers are grouped in 3 and gathered in large clusters surrounded by big, white bracts. these clusters are about 1 ft in length and are fragrant. Female flowers resemble pineapples.

In Hawaiʻi the male flower is called hīnano and the bracts are used for making very fine mats (moena hīnano''' or ʻahu hīnano).

Fruit
The female P. tectorius trees produce a segmented, large fruit. Although not closely related, the fruit resembles a pineapple. The fruit is made up of 38–200 wedge-like phalanges, often referred to as keys or carpels, which have an outer fibrous husk and are 8 inches in length. There are roughly 40 to 80 keys in each fruit and the color of the fruit can be yellow, orange, or red with a green top. Phalanges contain two seeds on average, with a maximum of eight reported. The phalanges are buoyant, and the seeds within them can remain viable for many months while being transported by ocean currents.

 Leaves 
They possess saw-like margins. Some varieties have spines along the edges and ribs throughout the leaves. The leaves are spirally arranged at the end of the branches.

 Taxonomy Pandanus tectorius was first described by Sydney Parkinson in 1774. It is an angiosperm belonging to the genus Pandanus of the family Pandanaceae.

DistributionPandanus tectorius grows natively from the Philippines through the Pacific Ocean to Hawaii. It is found in parts of Malesia (the Cocos (Keeling) Islands, Java, the Lesser Sunda Islands, the Maluku Islands and the Philippines), throughout Papuasia, and in most of the tropical Pacific. In Australia, it is native to an area from Port Macquarie in New South Wales to northern Queensland. Both the US and the Hawaiian Islands recognize only one indigenous species, P. tectorius. Its exact native range is unknown due to extensive cultivation; it may be an early Polynesian introduction to many of the more isolated Pacific islands on which it occurs. These islands include Micronesia and Melanesia.  In Hawaii, P. tectorius  is found natively on all the main islands except Kahoʻolawe, and it is known to have predated human settlement, based on seed and pollen samples taken from Kauai's Makauwahi Cave.

It requires  of annual rainfall and seasons will fluctuate from wet to dry.Pandanus tectorius is considered more drought tolerant than coconut trees. The trees have adapted to drought by reducing fruiting. Thatch Screwpine is well adapted to grow in the many soil types present on coasts, including quartz sand, coral sand, and peat, as well as in limestone and basalt. P. tectorius is salt and wind tolerant and favors slightly acidic to basic soil (pH of 6–10). The trees are strong and can typically withstand tropical storms. It prefers to grow in full sunlight, but grows well with 30-50% shade. It will not tolerate shade above 70%.

Ecology
There are a wide range of natural enemies that pose a threat to P. tectorius such as parasites, pathogens, and herbivores. They attack the leaves, roots, stems, and growing points. The stick insect Megacrania batesii lives and feeds only on P. tectorius and two other Pandanus species.Pandanus tectorius in Australia is threatened by a sap-sucking insect, Jamella australiae, a species of the genus Jamella of the subfamily Flatinae, known as the Pandanus planthopper. It has caused much damage to plants on the northern coast of New South Wales, before making its way up the coast to Noosa and the Gold Coast in Queensland in the 1990s. Since then it has infested pandanus further north, killing about 80 per cent of the P. tectorius population to the south of Gladstone, Queensland, and has since reached Yeppoon on the Capricorn Coast, where P. tectorius  plays an important part in preventing coastal erosion. A natural predator in the form of a wasp native to northern Queensland, Aphanomerus pusillus, has been introduced on Fraser Island and in Byfield National Park as one of methods used to combat the pest. Other methods used on Fraser Island including the injection of insecticide into the plant, stripping infested leaves away, and breeding new plants from local stock. The wasp can only be used in the warmer months on the island, as it does not thrive in the cooler climate of southern Queensland.

 Cultivation Pandanus tectorius plants grown from seed tend to flower at around 15 years old versus those grown from branch cutting. Flowering from trees grown from cuttings happens much earlier, typically by 3 to 4 years of age and always by 6 years old. (thom) The trees are either male of female. Female trees typically flower 1 to 3 times per year while male trees will flower every 2 months. It is thought to reproduce sexually in Hawaii, but there is some evidence that apomixis occurs. Small insects, such as bees, and wind are usually the pollinators. It takes 1 to 2 years from pollination to harvest to produce fruit on female trees.

Seasons vary amongst locations and varieties. For example, in Fiji the pollination season is March to May, in northern Australia it is April to August, and in Micronesia, there are two season December to March and July to September. Most varieties produce 8 to 12 fruits per tree every 2 years. Each fruit usually weighs between 7 and 15 kg and contains 35 to 80 edible keys.Pandanus tectorius plants are usually propagated by seed in Hawaii. Soak the keys in cool tap water for 5 days while frequently changing the water. Viable keys will float, so it is important to keep them. In Growing native Hawaiian plants: a how-to guide for the gardner, Bornhorst says to remove the fleshy layer of the key and then bury the seed half-way in planting soil. It is important to keep the soil most.P. tectorius can also be grown from large cutting. Selected forms are propagated by stem cuttings in Micronesia. Morphological traits looked for include aerial roots. Plants selected have 2/3 of their leaves trimmed off to prevent water loss. In Native Hawaiian plants for tropical seaside landscaping, Moriarty says for best results use mature branches with leaves and small aerial roots. Then root in a sand bed. Plants grown from cutting produce fruit in 4 to 6 years.

Propagation by grafting is not applicable.

Uses
The fruit of Pandanus tectorius is edible. Some varieties and cultivars contain significant amounts of calcium oxalate, so need thorough cooking before being consumed. Other cultivars contain very little to no calcium oxalate and can be eaten raw. It is an important food source in the atolls of Micronesia and Polynesia, with the fruit commonly eaten raw or turned into a dried paste (e.g., the mokwan in the Marshall Islands or the te tuae in Kiribati) or flour. It is also one of the traditional foods of Maldivian cuisine. The fibrous nature of the fruit also serves as a natural dental floss. It is also used in Samoan culture as a ula fala, a necklace made out of the dried fruit painted in red and is worn by the matai during special occasions and functions.

Australian Aboriginal peoples extracted the slender, edible seeds. This seed and the fruit, was an important food.

The tree's leaves are often used as flavoring for sweet dishes. It is also used in Sri Lankan cookery, where the leaves are used to flavor a variety of curries. Leaves were used by the Polynesians to make baskets, mats, outrigger canoe sails, thatch roofs, and grass skirts.

The fragrant male flowers are used in perfumery and are also distilled to make Kewra.

A large shrub or small tree of immense cultural, health, and economic importance in the Pacific, it is second only to coconut on atolls. It grows wild mainly in semi-natural vegetation in littoral habitats throughout the tropical and subtropical Pacific, where it can withstand drought, strong winds, and salt spray. It propagates readily from seed, but it is also widely propagated from branch cuttings by local people for farms and home gardens. It grows fairly quickly, and all parts are used, from the nutritious fruits of edible varieties to the poles and branches in construction to the leaves for weaving and garlands. The plant is prominent in Pacific culture and tradition, including local medicine.

Hundreds of cultivated varieties are known by their local names and characteristics of fruits, branches, and leaves. At present, there is evidence that this diversity is declining, with certain varieties becoming difficult to find. The reasons include less replanting, deforestation, fire, flagging interest by the new generation, and rapid population growth leading to urbanization.

Culture
The seal of Punahou School in Honolulu, Hawaii features the hala tree, in part because lauhala, the art of weaving with the leaves of that tree, is pivotal to the history of the island, with everything from houses to pillows being made in this fashion. Local legend tells of an aged Hawaiian couple who lived long ago above the present Punahou campus, and had to travel far for water. They prayed each night for a spring, but to no avail. Finally one night, in a dream answering their prayers, they were told to uproot the stump of an old hala tree. They did as they were told and found a spring of clear, sweet water, which they named Ka Punahou, the New Spring. According to legend, Punahou School's lily pond is fed by this same spring.

 Gallery 

See also
 Domesticated plants and animals of Austronesia

References

External links

 Pandanus tectorius from Foster Garden, Honolulu, Oahu Island, Hawai'i World plants, visual gallery University of Murcia. Spain
 NSW Department of Environment & Climate Change 
 Australian Native Plants - John W. Wrigley & Murray Fagg 
 Christenhusz, M.J.M. (2009). Typification of ornamental plants: Pandanus tectorius (Pandanaceae). Phytotaxa'' 2: 51–52.
 The World's Best Photos of puhala, Flickr Hive Mind, flickrhivemind.net, related pictures, also the fruits partially dismantled

tectorius
Australian cuisine
Oceanian cuisine
Gilbertese cuisine
Marshallese cuisine
Micronesian cuisine
Polynesian cuisine
Flora of Malesia
Flora of Papuasia
Flora of New South Wales
Flora of Queensland
Flora of the Pacific
Plants described in 1773
Edible fruits